Campbell River may refer to:

Canada
 Campbell Branch Little Black River, in Quebec, Canada; and Maine, United States
 Campbell River, British Columbia, Canada, a city on Vancouver Island
 Campbell River (Vancouver Island), the river on which the city is located, and its namesake
 Campbell River (Semiahmoo Bay), a smaller river in Langley and Surrey, British Columbia
 Campbell River 11, properly known as Campbell River Indian Reserve No. 1, an Indian reserve surrounded by the City of Campbell River

Others countries
 Campbell River (Tasmania), Australia
 Campbell Branch Little Black River, in Maine, United States; and Quebec, Canada